The Colored Orphan Asylum was an institution in New York City, open from 1836 to 1946. It housed on average four hundred children annually and was mostly managed by women. Its first location was on Fifth Avenue between 42nd and 43rd Streets in Midtown Manhattan, a four-story building with two wings. It later moved to Upper Manhattan and then to Riverdale in the Bronx.

History 
The Colored Orphan Asylum was founded in Manhattan in 1836 by three Quakers: Anna and Hanna Shotwell and Mary Lindley Murray. It was one of the first of its kind in the United States to take in black children whose parents had died, or were not able to take care of them. Prior to its founding, orphaned black children were housed in jails or worked as beggars or chimney sweeps as orphanages refused to take them. The orphanage initially offered schooling only for infants, feeling that their wards would not advance far in society due to being Black and orphans. Older children were bound by indentured servitude in which they were contracted to families, both Black and white, to learn a trade or skill until age 21. The families, in turn, paid a small fee to the Colored Orphan Asylum for the services which were placed in the bank for when the child left the institution. By 1897, schooling was increased until grade six and sent several students to the Hampton Institute for further study. In 1918 schooling was increased until grade eight and the indenture system evolved into a loose foster care system in which the child was to be incorporated into the family and continue their studies. In 1846 Dr. James McCune Smith, the country's first licensed African American medical doctor, became the orphanage's medical director. The orphanage moved several times in Manhattan.

1863 riots 

In March 1863, conscription in the United States became stricter, and the federal government used a lottery system to choose citizens for the draft.  Those chosen could hire a substitute or pay the government, but most working-class men could not afford substitution, while black men were ineligible for the draft (they were not considered citizens of the United States at the time).  Working-class white males, furious about the federal draft laws, rioted and attacked federal buildings and black neighborhoods.  The Colored Orphan Asylum was burned down by Irish mobs on July 13, 1863, during the first day of the New York Draft Riots.

Rebuilding

The asylum was rebuilt by the Quakers in 1867 on 143rd Street and Amsterdam Avenue. The operation moved to a new building in 1907, in Riverdale, Bronx.  At the new site, the orphanage adopted a new plan to house its wards in cottages, with 25 children and a housemother in each cottage. The new plan was received favorably and encouraged ownership and self-respect in the children. In 1910, the asylum purchased a farm in Dutchess County for boys to learn practical skills.

In 1944, the asylum was renamed the Riverdale Children's Association and changed itself into a foster care agency by 1946. The building later became the Hebrew Home for the Aged.

See also 
 Howard Colored Orphan Asylum

References

Relevant literature 
Seraile, William. Angels of mercy: White women and the history of New York's Colored orphan asylum. Fordham Univ Press, 2013.
Sappol, Mike. 1990. The Uses of Philanthropy: The Colored Orphan Asylum and Its Clients. Columbia University: MA thesis.
Riverdale Childrens Association, 120th anniversary, 1836-1956. Founded in 1836 as the Association for the Benefit of Colored Orphans by N.Y. Riverdale Children's Association (New York).
From Cherry Street to Green Pastures: A History of the Colored Orphan Asylum at Riverdale-on-Hudson, 1836-1936 (New York: Riverdale Children's Association, 1936)

External links 
 
 http://dlib.nyu.edu/findingaids/html/nyhs/coloredorphan/bioghist.html

1836 establishments in New York (state)
1863 crimes in the United States
1946 disestablishments in New York (state)
19th century in New York City
20th century in New York City
African-American history in New York City
Arson in New York City
Fifth Avenue
July 1863 events
Orphanages in New York (state)
Riots and civil disorder in New York City
Riverdale, Bronx
Building and structure fires in New York City